Patricia M. McCarthy (born 1962) is an Assistant Director in the Commercial Litigation Branch of the United States Department of Justice Civil Division and is a former nominee for judge of the United States Court of Federal Claims.

Biography

McCarthy received an Artium Baccalaureus degree, cum laude, in 1984 from Colby College. She received a Juris Doctor in 1989 from Cornell Law School. From 1989 to 1994, she worked at the law firm of Bingham, Dana & Gould in Boston, Massachusetts. She joined the Commercial Litigation Branch of the United States Department of Justice Civil Division in 1994, was promoted to Senior Trial Counsel in 2001, and to Assistant Director in 2003.  In November 2021, she was named Director of the National Courts section in the Commercial Litigation Branch. Over the course of her career, she has litigated a wide variety of cases before the United States Court of Appeals for the Federal Circuit, the United States Court of Federal Claims and the United States Court of International Trade.

Expired nomination to Claims Court

On May 21, 2014, President Obama nominated McCarthy to serve as a Judge of the United States Court of Federal Claims, to the seat vacated by Judge Emily C. Hewitt, who retired on October 21, 2013. She received a hearing on her nomination on Tuesday, June 24, 2014. On July 17, 2014 her nomination was reported out of committee by voice vote.

On December 16, 2014 her nomination was returned to the President due to the sine die adjournment of the 113th Congress. On January 7, 2015, President Obama renominated her to the same position.
On February 26, 2015 her nomination was reported out of committee by voice vote. Her nomination expired on January 3, 2017, with the end of the 114th Congress.

References

1962 births
Colby College alumni
Cornell Law School alumni
Living people
Massachusetts lawyers
People from Medford, Massachusetts